Temuco is a city and commune, capital of the Cautín Province and of the Araucanía Region in southern Chile. The city grew out from a fort of the same name established in 1881 during Chile's invasion of Araucanía. Temuco lies in the middle of the historic Araucanía, a traditional land of the indigenous Mapuche.

Temuco's central place in Araucanía with easy access to the Andean valleys, lakes and coastal areas makes it a hub for tourism, agricultural, livestock and forestry operations as well as a communication and trade centre for the numerous small towns of Araucanía. Temuco has recently been regarded as a university city as it houses two large universities: University of the Frontier and Temuco Catholic University. Nobel laureates Gabriela Mistral and Pablo Neruda both lived in Temuco for some time.

Etymology

The word Temuco comes from the Mapudungun language, meaning "temu water"; "temu" is the common name of two native trees of the family Myrtaceae, Luma apiculata (also known as arrayán in Spanish) and Blepharocalyx cruckshanksii. Both species are characterized by their orange-reddish bark and by having aromatic fruits and leaves which are commonly used by the Mapuche for medicinal purposes. While Blepharocalyx cruckschankii is endangered, Luma apiculata is relatively common and in Temuco it is possible to see it in the Cerro Ñielol Natural Monument (in its natural state) as well as in city gardens and sidewalks. The blend between the words "temu" and "co" (water), probably reflects the fact that these trees frequently grow beside water bodies.

History

The city was founded by Chilean army on February 24, 1881, as a fort during the Occupation of the Araucanía. Manuel Recabarren, in charge of the project, named the place Fuerte (Fort) Recabarren.

Formed as a military encampment, Temuco had in its origins the attributes of a camp, and a year after its founding, the first major streets started to form in the downtown area.

On April 15, 1888, the first city officers were elected including the first mayor José del Rosario Muñoz. The city grew quickly; a census in 1895 indicated a population of 7,708 people, and when Cautin was declared a province, Temuco became its capital, with its population by that time of 16,037 people.

Chilean poetry has deep roots in Temuco. Nobel laureates Gabriela Mistral and Pablo Neruda (Neftalí Reyes) both lived in Temuco. Mistral was the principal of an all-girls school where Neruda would visit her and show her his first verses when he was around 15 years old.

In 2010 Temuco was affected by the earthquake on February 27 centered  to the north. It was one of the most affected regions of Chile besides Santiago, Concepcion, Valparaíso and others. The earthquake registered 8.8 Mw on the moment magnitude scale.
Nowadays, Temuco is a fast growing city with diversified commerce and services.

Demographics

According to the 2002 census by the National Statistics Institute (INE), Temuco had a communal population of 245,347 (117,071 men and 128,276 women). Of these, 232,528 (94.8%) lived in urban areas and 12,819 (5.2%) in rural areas. The population grew by 24.4% (48,111 persons) between the 1992 and 2002 censuses. The INE projected the 2010 population to be 377,495, which makes it the second largest city south of Santiago (behind Concepción), and the fourth largest in the country. One of the distinctive features of Temuco is the strong presence of the Mapuche culture, who make up 23.1% of the population in the Temuco commune, and numerous German immigrant colonies (9.8%). Temuco proper has a population of 227,086.

The locals are called temuquenses. The inhabitants have diverse origins. Temuco has a high percentage of people of Basque ancestry, as well as Castilian and other Spanish nationalities. There is a substantial indigenous component, mainly Mapuche, accounting for 13% of the population of Temuco, which makes it the city of Chile with the largest indigenous presence. 
There is also a large percentage of temuquences directly descended from European immigrants, many of whom arrived during 1883–1901 after the pacification of Araucanía. The main European sources are Switzerland, Spain, France, Germany, Italy and the United Kingdom. Others, less numerous and from many other parts of Europe such as the Netherlands, Austria, Croatia, Armenia, Greece, Portugal, etc., arrived after that first migration, especially during the World Wars. During the Spanish Civil War (1930s), a large percentage of Aragonese, Asturians, Catalans, Galicians, Navarrese and Basques reached a significant number of immigrants from Europe (mainly Spain).

There are also small communities of Jews, from Russia, Poland, Macedonia, Hungary, as well as Central and Eastern Europe in general), and Arabs, from Lebanon, Syria and Palestine). This immigration from Europe and, to a lesser extent, Jewish and Arabic areas helps to explain the various clubs, schools, and sections of the city of Temuco. There are East Asian colonies of Chinese, Japanese and Koreans in Temuco, dating back to the end of the Korean War in the 1950s when thousands of Korean refugees settled through U.N. relocation programs to Chile.

Notable people
 Yanara Aedo, professional footballer
 Gustavo Becerra-Schmidt, composer
 Rosa Catrileo, member of the Constitutional Convention and land rights advocate
 Fuad Chahín, politician, former president of the Christian Democratic Party
 María José Ferrada, children's author and journalist
 Dagoberto Godoy, aviator
 Fabiola Letelier, lawyer and human rights advocate
 Marcelo Moren Brito, member of Pinochet's secret police, convicted of crimes against humanity
 Pablo Neruda, 1971 winner of the Nobel Prize in Literature
 Leonor Oyarzún, former first lady of Chile
 Andrea Parra, politician
 Natalia Riffo, politician in Bachelet administration and psychologist
 Karina Riquelme Viveros, human rights lawyer
 Marcelo Salas, retired footballer, chairman of local football club Deportes Temuco
 Luis Salvadores Salvi, Chilean basketball player
 Raúl Sohr, journalist, sociologist and writer
 Tanza Varela, actress and model
 Ena von Baer, journalist and right-wing politician

Geography

Temuco is located in a valley in the center-south of Chile, equidistant between the Pacific Ocean to the west and the Andes to the east. Morphologically, the city placement corresponds to Cautín River-originated fluvial land masses that developed in a crushed form between two hills, Ñielol (350m) and Conunhueno (360m).

Economy and environment 

The city is surrounded by a landscape typical to central-southern Chile, consisting mostly of plantations of exotic species used in forestry along with prairies. The original ecosystem of the area consisting in temperate forest is present mostly in the Ñielol hill. Given that burning wood is the primary source of heat during the cold months in Temuco, air pollution is a recurrent problem during autumn and winter. As a consequence, Air quality in Temuco is the third lowest in Chile.

Climate 
Climatologically, Temuco lies at the border of Chile's central valley Mediterranean region, albeit with an oceanic climate (Köppen climate classification: Cfb). Through the year, cyclonic and anticyclonic influences alternate, with a distinct drier summer period (although not as dry as Santiago or other central valley cities, receiving just enough precipitation to avoid a Mediterranean climate classification).

Administration
As a commune, Temuco is a third-level administrative division of Chile administered by a municipal council, headed by an alcalde who is directly elected every four years. The 2008-2012 alcalde is Miguel Becker Alvear (RN).

Within the electoral divisions of Chile, Temuco is represented in the Chamber of Deputies by Germán Becker (RN) and René Saffirio (PDC) as part of the 50th electoral district, together with Padre Las Casas. The commune is represented in the Senate by José Garcia Ruminot (RN) and Eugenio Tuma Zedan (PPD) as part of the 15th senatorial constituency (Araucanía-South).

Sports
Temuco, is as well known as "La ciudad del deporte" which means, the city of sports. Temuco hosts one of the newest as well as biggest stadiums in the country, the "German Becker" stadium; home to the local soccer team "Deportes Temuco".

This stadium has hosted numerous local sports events, as well as international ones. They are as follows:
FIFA U20 Women's World Cup in 2008
WORLD RUGBY's U20 RUGBY WORLD TROPHY in 2013
AMERICAN CUP's in 2015

Temuco was also one of the host cities of the official 1959 Basketball World Cup, where Chile won the bronze medal. Further to that, Temuco has numerous gyms and parks where people can go on their leisure time.

Transportation

Buses and collective taxis are the most popular modes of mass transit. The bus fare is CLP$150 for students and $450 for adults; the colectivos charge $500 ($650 at night). 

La Araucanía Airport is commercial air terminal for Temuco located to the south of the city, near the town of Freire, about 20 minutes south of Temuco.

The railroad connects Temuco with Victoria to the north and points in between.

Temuco does not have a rapid transit rail system.

Long-haul buses run from the Terminal Rodoviario de la Araucania, at the northern approach to town.

Private transport by car is commonly used which causes traffic congestion at peak hours.

The recent proliferation of bike lanes has placed transportation by bicycle as an emerging trend. By 2017,  of bike lanes are expected to be operative.

Important places
 Cerro Ñielol
The Ñielol Hill houses the original temperate forest at this latitude in southern Chile as it was before the Spanish people colonised it. Currently, it has the status of natural monument and as such, it is a protected area. It has also a special meaning for the Mapuche people living in the Region, housing near the top a ceremonial area called La Patagua. We can also find a restaurant at the top of the Hill and a viewpoint of the east side of the city and Padre Las Casas, across the river. It is easily accessed by foot or car. The Southern Andean Volcano Observatory has its office there.

 Central market
The central market is one of the best places to get Mapuche crafts. It has a meat market and shops selling woodcrafts, artifacts, wool knits, and similar goods. A fire has recently affected its structure. Reconstruction is planned, but the original market is currently closed.

 Feria Pinto
One of the most traditional places in the city. Fresh fruits and vegetables are sold here in a daily basis. People from the city and from rural nearby towns come here for trade.

 Alemania Avenue
Is the principal artery in Temuco. Here we can find The Araucaria Museum building (19th century Chilean style); the Menchaca Lira Campus of Art Building (a Victorian Style building, recently restored); The English Alley, where we can find the Red Cross Building and not long ago a blue house which was dismantled to be rebuilt elsewhere (as a Heritage recovery project by the school of architecture of a known University of Temuco), both Neoclassical styled.

Recently, Alemania Av. has become an important commercial centre. Several restaurants, night clubs, pubs, bistros, pharmacies, boutiques, banks, supermarkets and two shopping malls have been opened there. There is also a Casino and a five stars hotel in the same avenue.

 Anibal Pinto Square
The core of Downtown Temuco is the Main Square Anibal Pinto. Temuco's Main Square is the only one in Chile that was not built with a water fountain in its centre; an art gallery was built in 1981 as part of a total renewal. Compared to other main squares of southern Chile, Temuco's looks very modern. It was named one of Chile's most beautiful plazas.
It is a tradition, in all creole cities in Chile, that some specific buildings must be in front of the main square; in Temuco, this tradition has been broken. Main Squares are supposed to be surrounded by: a Cathedral (which is in front of Temuco's main square, as traditionally), the Municipality (which also, is located in front of the square), a Theatre (there used to be a film theatre in front of it), a Fire Station (there is not a fire station in front of the square, as it should), a School (there is no school in front of the main square), and a Bank (there are four banks around the main square).

References

External links

 Ilustre Municipalidad de Temuco
 Mercado Municipal de Temuco

 
Communes of Chile
Capitals of Chilean regions
Capitals of Chilean provinces
Populated places established in 1881
Populated places in Cautín Province
1881 establishments in Chile